Malta Conference can refer to:
Malta Conference (1945), between Franklin D. Roosevelt and Winston Churchill at the end of World War II.
Malta Summit (1989), between George H. W. Bush and Mikhail Gorbachev at the end of the Cold War.